Udon Thani is a city in Isan (Northeast Thailand), the capital of Udon Thani Province and with a population of approximately 430,000 in its urban area the 7th largest city in the country. The city municipality (city proper) had a population of 130,531 people as of 2019. Udon Thani is one of four major cities in Isan, namely Nakhon Ratchasima, Ubon Ratchathani, Udon Thani, and Khon Kaen. Together they are known as the "big four of Isan".

Location
Udon is approximately 560 km from Bangkok. It is a major official and commercial center in northern Isan, Thailand, and the gateway to Laos, northern Vietnam, and southern China.

History
The city's economy was boosted by the proximity to Udorn Royal Thai Air Force Base during the Vietnam War and retains reminders of that time in the form of bars, coffee shops, and hotels. "Udon sort of became like Pattaya when the GIs arrived," said a local architect. "Restaurants serving Western cuisine, hotels and nightclubs sprouted up everywhere to meet their needs. It was an extremely busy city back then."

The BBC has reported that Udon Thani's Royal Air Force Base was the site of a CIA black site, known to insiders as "Detention Site Green", used to interrogate Abu Zubaydah, Saudi-born Palestinian, believed to be one of Osama Bin Laden's top lieutenants. In December 2014 the United States Senate Select Committee on Intelligence (SSCI) published an executive summary of a secret 6,000-page report on CIA techniques. The report alleges that at least eight Thai senior officials knew of the secret site. The site was closed in December 2002.

Earlier reports alleged that a Voice of America relay station in a rural area of Udon Thani Province, Ban Dung District, was the CIA black site.

Administration

(chumchon), 130,531 people in 60,659 households.

Transport

Udon Thani International Airport, close to the city centre (within the ring road), serves a number of domestic airports: Chiang Mai International Airport, U-Tapao International Airport (Pattaya), and Phuket, with approximately 24 daily flights to Bangkok (Don Mueang International and Suvarnabhumi Airport). During  the 2020-2021 COVID-19 pandemic flights were reduced to 10 - 14 daily to the Bangkok airports only.

Udon Thani railway station in the city centre receives four trains daily from Bangkok railway station (Hua Lamphong) including overnight sleepers.

Economy

Mining
Asia Pacific Potash Corporation (APPC), a wholly owned subsidiary of Italian-Thai Development PLC, owns the concession to the Udon North and Udon South potash mines and plans to develop them. Potash deposits in northeast Thailand are believed to contain the world's third-largest—after Canada and Russia—unexploited potash reserves. Potash is one of the main components of agricultural fertilizer.

Climate
Udon Thani has a tropical savanna climate (Köppen climate classification Aw). Winters are fairly dry and very warm. The monsoon season runs from late-April through early-October, with heavy rain and somewhat cooler temperatures during the day, although nights remain warm.

Sister cities
  Bandung, West Java, Indonesia
  Reno, Nevada, United States
  Lusaka, Zambia

References

External links 

 
 

Isan
Populated places in Udon Thani province